Eperezolid is an oxazolidinone antibiotic.

Synthesis

See also 
Linezolid

References 

Oxazolidinone antibiotics
Acetamides
Fluoroarenes
Piperazines
Primary alcohols